Banyule Homestead is a heritage-listed house at 60 Buckingham Drive, Heidelberg, Victoria, Australia. It is listed in the Victorian Heritage Database and has local heritage protection.

History 
The house was built in 1846 for Port Phillip pioneer Joseph Hawdon and designed in the Elizabethan style by the architect John Gill. Banyule Homestead is a rare pre-goldrush house that has survived into current times.

Former residents of the house have included prominent Victorian settlers such as James Graham, William Mitchell and Dr Robert Martin.

From 1975 to 1977, the house was altered to provide a gallery space for the National Gallery of Victoria's Heidelberg School Collection. The property was subsequently sold and returned into private hands in 1995.

Current use 
A 2017 application to Banyule City Council to convert the property into a function centre was contested by the community, Banyule Estate Residents Group and the Heidelberg Historical Society. This application was rejected, as was a later appeal.

References 

Houses in Melbourne
Heidelberg, Victoria
Homesteads in Victoria
Heritage sites in Melbourne
Heritage-listed buildings in Melbourne
Buildings and structures in the City of Banyule
Houses completed in 1846
1846 establishments in Australia